Pilot is an unincorporated community in Montgomery County, Virginia, United States. Pilot has a post office with ZIP code 24138.

The Guerrant House was listed on the National Register of Historic Places in 1989.

Climate
The climate in this area is characterized by hot, humid summers and generally mild to cool winters.  According to the Köppen Climate Classification system, Pilot has a humid subtropical climate, abbreviated "Cfa" on climate maps.

References

Unincorporated communities in Montgomery County, Virginia
Unincorporated communities in Virginia